The IBM 1030 Data Collection System was a remote terminal system created by IBM in Endicott, New York in 1963, intended to transmit data from remote locations to a central computer system.

Description

The system consisted of the following components:
 1031 Input Station. The 1031 systems could contain a card reader, badge reader, or manual input device. The 1031A contained the communications logic required to transmit data to a remote computer system ("central output unit" in IBM terminology). The 1031B communicated through an attached 1031A.
 1032 Digital Time Unit. This device was located at central site and provided timestamps to incoming data.
 1033 Printer. This was a remote printer attached to the 1031A.
 1034 Card Punch. The 1034 was located at the central site and functioned as an output device for the 1030 when the computer system was offline.
 1035 Badge Reader

The 1030 had limited editing capabilities, which consisted of checking that all required data was entered before transmitting a transaction.

The 1030 originally attached to an IBM 1440 computer through a 1448 Transmission Control Unit.  Later it could be attached to an IBM System/360.

References

IBM computer terminals